Tveit Church is a parish church of the Church of Norway in Askøy Municipality in Vestland county, Norway. It is located in the village of Tveitevåg on the western side of the island of Askøy. It is the church for the Tveit parish which is part of the Vesthordland prosti (deanery) in the Diocese of Bjørgvin. The white, wooden church was built in a long church design in 2017 using plans drawn up by the architectural firm Tippetue arkitekter from Bergen. The church seats about 500 people.

History
The first church at Tveitevåg was built in 1957. The white, wooden church was built in a long church style using designs by the architects Torgeir Alvsaker and Einar Vaardal-Lunde. Oskar Edvardsen was the lead builder for the project. The church seated about 300 people. It was consecrated on 5 May 1957. Over time, the church was too small for the parish, so it was torn down in 2016 and a new, larger church was completed in 2017 and consecrated on 20 August 2017. The new church has a similar design to the old church, but it is  wider and  longer.

See also
List of churches in Bjørgvin

References

Askøy
Churches in Vestland
Long churches in Norway
Wooden churches in Norway
21st-century Church of Norway church buildings
Churches completed in 2017
1957 establishments in Norway